Garoua (also Garua; Fula: 𞤺𞤢𞤪𞤱𞤢, Garwa) is a port city and the capital of the North Region of Cameroon, lying on the Benue River. A thriving centre of the textiles and cotton industries, the city has approximately 1,285,000 inhabitants in 2020, mostly Fulbe/Fulani.

History
Garoua was established by the Fulani emir Modibbo Adama in the first half of the 19th century.  During the steamship era, it developed into a major river port.

The population of the city was 30,000 in 1967.

Geography
Garoua is situated in northern Cameroon, and lies on the Benue River. It serves as the gateway to Benoue National Park. Neighborhoods include Commercial Centre, Lopere, Quartier de Marouare, Poumpoumre, Roumde Adjia and the northwestern suburb of Yelwa, near Garoua International Airport.

Climate
Garoua has a tropical savanna climate (Köppen Aw), with a wet season and a dry season and the temperature being hot year-round. The hottest time of year is in March and April, just before the wet season starts.

Garoua receives  of rain over 88 precipitation days, with a distinct wet and dry season like most tropical savanna climates. December, January and February receive no precipitation at all. August, the wettest month, receives  of rainfall on average. September has 24 precipitation days, which is the most of any month. Garoua receives 2927.1 hours of sunshine annually on average, with the sunshine being distributed evenly across the year, although it is lower during the wet season.

Demographics
In 2005, Garoua had a population of 495,996 people. The city is inhabited by the Fulbe ethnic group. Due to a significant number of Chadian expatriates in the city, there is a Chadian Consulate.

Economy
As the fourth largest port in Cameroon, Garoua is a major center of trade in the country. It developed as a centre for trade in petroleum, cement, hides, peanuts, and cotton, transported on ships along the Benue River, between Burutu in Nigeria. It has long been a thriving centre of the cotton industry and houses several textile processing facilities and factories. The cotton company Sodecoton has one of its major centres in the city. Leatherwork and fishing are also notable industries.

Sport
Roumdé Adjia Stadium is set to be one of the arenas hosting the 2021 Africa Cup of Nations.

Places of worship   
Among the places of worship, there are, predominantly, Muslim mosques. There are also Christian churches and temples: Roman Catholic Archdiocese of Garoua (Catholic Church), Evangelical Church of Cameroon (World Communion of Reformed Churches), Presbyterian Church in Cameroon (World Communion of Reformed Churches), Cameroon Baptist Convention (Baptist World Alliance), Full Gospel Mission Cameroon (Assemblies of God).

Transport
Garoua is served by  Garoua International Airport. 
 The United States military uses the airport as a base to conduct unmanned aerial vehicle operations. The city lies on National Highway 1, at a junction of the road between Maroua and Ngaoundéré. The main road leading north through the town and past the airport is called Rue de la Gendarmerie.

Notable people
 Goggo Addi (1911–1999), storyteller who worked to preserve Fulani cultural heritage

 Ahmadou Ahidjo (1924–1989), first president of Cameroon
Vincent Aboubakar Famous Footballer and Starter for the Cameroon Football team
 Youssoufa Daoua (in French) (1947-2015), politician 
 Gautier Bello (born 1983), footballer

References

External links
 

 
Populated places in North Region (Cameroon)
Provincial capitals in Cameroon
Benue River